Enos Hook (December 3, 1804 – July 15, 1841) was a Democratic member of the U.S. House of Representatives from Pennsylvania.

Biography
Enos Hook was born in Waynesburg, Pennsylvania.  He studied law, was admitted to the bar in 1826 and commenced practice in Waynesburg.  He served as a member of the Pennsylvania House of Representatives in 1837 and 1838.

Hook was elected as a Democrat to the Twenty-sixth and Twenty-seventh Congresses and served until April 18, 1841, when he resigned.  He died in Waynesburg in 1841.  Interment in Green Mount Cemetery.

Sources

The Political Graveyard

1804 births
1841 deaths
Democratic Party members of the Pennsylvania House of Representatives
People from Waynesburg, Pennsylvania
Pennsylvania lawyers
Democratic Party members of the United States House of Representatives from Pennsylvania
19th-century American politicians
19th-century American lawyers